The 1874 Buckinghamshire by-election was fought on 17 March 1874.  The byelection was fought due to the incumbent Conservative MP, Benjamin Disraeli, becoming the prime minister and First Lord of the Treasury and so having to resign his seat.  It was retained by Disraeli, who was unopposed.

References

1874 elections in the United Kingdom
1874 in England
19th century in Buckinghamshire
By-elections to the Parliament of the United Kingdom in Buckinghamshire constituencies
Unopposed ministerial by-elections to the Parliament of the United Kingdom in English constituencies
March 1874 events
Benjamin Disraeli